is a professional Japanese baseball player. He plays pitcher for the Saitama Seibu Lions.

External links

 NPB.com

1998 births
Living people
Baseball people from Tochigi Prefecture
Japanese baseball players
Nippon Professional Baseball pitchers
Saitama Seibu Lions players